The 2017 Fermanagh Senior Football Championship was the 111th edition of the Fermanagh GAA's premier club Gaelic football tournament for senior clubs in County Fermanagh, Northern Ireland. The tournament consists of 8 teams, with the winner representing Fermanagh in the Ulster Senior Club Football Championship. The championship had a straight knock-out format.

Derrygonnelly Harps were the defending champions, going for their third championship in a row.

Derrygonnelly completed their three in a row by beating Devenish St Mary's in the decider.

Team changes
The following teams have changed division since the 2016 championship season.

To Championship
Promoted from 2016 Intermediate Championship
 Kinawley Brian Borus – (Intermediate Champions)
 Tempo Maguires – (Intermediate Runners-up)

From Championship
Relegated to 2017 Intermediate Championship
 Irvinestown St Molaise - (Relegation Play-off Losers)
 St Patrick's Donagh – (Relegation Play-off Losers)

Bracket

Quarter-finals

Semi-finals

Final

Relegation Playoffs
The four losers of the quarter-finals playoff in this round. The two losers will face off in a relegation final, with the loser to be relegated to the 2018 Intermediate Championship.

Relegation semi-finals

Relegation Final

References

Fermanagh Senior Football Championship
Fermanagh Senior Football Championship